The men's 110 metres hurdles event at the 2007 Asian Athletics Championships was held in Amman, Jordan on July 28–29.

Medalists

Results

Heats
Wind: Heat 1: +0.2 m/s, Heat 2: -0.9 m/s

Final
Wind: +5.3 m/s

References
Heats results
Final results

2007 Asian Athletics Championships
Sprint hurdles at the Asian Athletics Championships